Andrew Wayne Anderson (born 1953) is a Canadian politician who was elected in the 2015 Alberta general election to the Legislative Assembly of Alberta representing the electoral district of Highwood.

Highwood had previously been held by Danielle Smith, the leader of the Wildrose before her defection to the Progressive Conservatives in December 2014. Smith was defeated for the PC nomination by Okotoks councillor Carrie Fischer, who was defeated in the general election by Anderson.

Anderson was defeated in his UCP nomination race in 2018 to RJ Sigurdson.

Electoral history

References

1950s births
Living people
Politicians from Winnipeg
Wildrose Party MLAs
21st-century Canadian politicians
United Conservative Party MLAs